The 2011 World Men's Handball Championship, the 22nd event hosted by the International Handball Federation, was held in Sweden from 13 to 30 January 2011. All matches were played in Malmö, Lund, Kristianstad, Gothenburg, Skövde, Jönköping, Linköping and Norrköping.

In the preliminary round, 24 teams from all the world's continents were split into 4 groups, with the first-placed 3 teams advancing through the main round in two groups, carrying the previously won points against the remaining teams. France won the tournament after defeating Denmark in the final, while Spain won the bronze medal after defeating Sweden in the third-place match. Thus, France has qualified for the tournament at the London Olympics. The teams that finished in 2nd–7th place will play Olympic Qualifying Tournaments.

The host broadcaster was the Swedish commercial network TV4 Sport and the television rights were sold to other countries.

One of the objectives of the championship was to create a multicultural party that extends far outside the handball arenas.

Venues

List of qualified teams
Bahrain and Chile qualified for their first ever handball World Championship. Austria qualified for the first time since 1993, which, coincidentally, was also hosted by Sweden.

The following 24 teams qualified for the final tournament:

EHF (14)
 
  
  
  
  
  
  
  
  
  
  
  
  
  
  (host)

CAHB (3)
 
 
 
AHF (3)
 
 
 
PATHF (3)
 
 
 
OHF (1)

Draw 
The draw was held on 9 July 2010 at the Scandinavium at Gothenburg, Sweden.

Squads

Each nation had to submit a squad of 16 players.

Match officials
On 25 October 2010, the match officials for the tournament were confirmed.

Preliminary round 

Twenty-four participating teams were placed in the following four groups. After playing a round-robin, the top three teams in each group advanced to the Main Round. The last three teams in each group played placement matches.

Tie-breaking criteria
For the three game group stage of this tournament, where two or more teams in a group tied on an equal number of points, the finishing positions will be determined by the following tie-breaking criteria in the following order
 number of points obtained in the matches among the teams in question
 goal difference in the matches among the teams in question
 number of goals scored in the matches among the teams in question (if more than two teams finish equal on points)
 goal difference in all the group matches
 number of goals scored in all the group matches
 drawing of lots

Group A (Kristianstad/Lund) 

All times are Central European Time (UTC+1)

Group B (Norrköping/Linköping) 

All times are Central European Time (UTC+1)

Group C (Malmö/Lund) 

All times are Central European Time (UTC+1)

Group D (Gothenburg) 

All times are Central European Time (UTC+1)

Main round 
The top three teams of every preliminary group advanced to the Main round. Every team kept the points from preliminary round matches against teams who also advanced. In the main round every team had 3 games against the opponents they did not face in the preliminary round. The top two of every group advanced to the Semifinals, the other teams played placement matches.

Group I (Jönköping) 

All times are Central European Time (UTC+1)

Group II (Malmö/Lund) 

All times are Central European Time (UTC+1)

Presidents Cup

Preliminary round

23rd-place match

21st-place match

19th-place match

17th-place match

15th-place match

13th-place match

Placement matches

11th-place match

9th-place match

7th-place match

5th-place match

Final round (Kristianstad/Malmö)

Semifinals

Bronze match

Final

The final was played at a sold-out Malmö Arena in Malmö between France and Denmark, and was followed by 12,462 spectators. In addition, the match was aired on both major Danish public television channels DR1 and TV 2 with 2,670,000 viewers, making it the most watched sport event in Denmark ever.

First half
The French team started the match with a 2–0 lead, and maintained a lead until the 17th minute, where Denmark started a 3–0 run and equalised at 9–9 with a penalty shot by Anders Eggert. On the next attack, Mikkel Hansen received the Danes' first two-minute suspension, allowing France to open another three-goal lead. The half time score was 15–12 in favor of France.

Second half
The second half started with France maintaining a lead of at least two goals in the first 15 minutes. But a couple of saves in a row by the well-tempered Niklas Landin Jacobsen, meant that Mikkel Hansen could equalise to 24–24 with 11 minutes to play. Still, France took the lead once again, but with five minutes remaining and the French lead at 29–27, Jérôme Fernandez was penalized with a 2-minute suspension. Denmark took advantage, scoring two goals and making it 29–29 with 3:30 remaining. In the last minute, the French found themselves one goal ahead, 31–30. The Danish coach Ulrik Wilbek used a team timeout with 25 seconds to go to prepare the team for the last attack. Three seconds were left, when the Dane Bo Spellerberg scored from left back a positional shot in the bottom of the goal for 31–31, deferring the match to overtime.

Overtime
In the 64th minute, the Danes recorded their first lead in the match when scoring 33–32, but within the next minute the French scored two goals overturning the result. The first half of the overtime ended with a French lead of 34–33.

The second half of overtime began with veteran Lars Christiansen scoring a penalty and evening the score at 34–34. The French took the lead from there, though, and secured the win at 36–34 when Thierry Omeyer saved a Mikkel Hansen 9m shot with just over one minute to go. Michael Guigou scored the last goal of the game with one second to go to the final score 37–35. The match ended 37–35 in favor of France. Nikola Karabatić and Mikkel Hansen, both scored 10 goals in the final, with Karabatić chosen the MVP of the championship, and Hansen the best goalscorer.

Ranking and statistics

Final ranking

All Star Team
Goalkeeper: 
Left wing: 
Left back: 
Pivot: 
Centre back: 
Right back: 
Right wing: 
Chosen by team officials and IHF experts: IHF.info

Other awards
Most Valuable Player:

IHF broadcasting rights
: TyC Sports
: ORF Sport Plus
: TV Esporte Interativo, BandSports
: HRT, ArenaSport
: Sport 1
: TV 2, DR
: Sport 1
: Canal +
: ARD, ZDF, SPORT1
: Sport 1
: KBS N
: Stöð 2 Sport
: TV 2
: TVP
: SportTV
, Middle East and North Africa: Al Jazeera Sports
: DolceSport
: NTV Plus Sport
: Radio Television of Serbia, Arena Sport
: Šport TV
: TVE, Canal+
: TV4

References

External links
Official website

World Handball Championship tournaments
Handball
World Men's Handball Championship
World Men's Handball Championship
January 2011 sports events in Europe
Sport in Lund
Sports competitions in Kristianstad
2010s in Malmö
2010s in Gothenburg
International sports competitions in Malmö
International sports competitions in Gothenburg
Sports competitions in Skövde
Sports competitions in Jönköping
Sports competitions in Linköping
Sports competitions in Norrköping
Events at Malmö Arena